The following is a partial list of private and public companies based in the mesoregion of Campinas, in the state of São Paulo, Brazil, as of August 2006. 

In the following table, Sales are expressed in million US dollars in 2005. Rank has been determined by a composite index developed by Exame magazine's  Maiores e Melhores 2005 (Largest and Best Companies of Brazil).

See also

 Brazilian Silicon Valley
 Economy of Brazil
 List of companies of Brazil

Campinas
Campinas